GQE may refer to:

 Equatorial Guinean ekwele, a former currency of Equatorial Guinea
 Glory Quest, a Japanese pornographic film studio
 Green Square railway station, in Sydney, Australia